Elisabet Sahtouris  is an evolution biologist, futurist, speaker, author and sustainability consultant to businesses, government agencies and other organizations. She is a US and Greek citizen who has lived in the US, Canada, Greece, Peru and Spain while lecturing, doing workshops and media appearances on all continents. She has a PhD from Dalhousie University in Canada. She consults with corporations and government organizations in Australia, Brazil, Europe, Asia, Africa and the United States.

Sahtouris co-convened two symposia on the foundations of science in Hokkaido and Kuala Lumpur. She is currently Professor in Residence at Chaminade University in Honolulu, Hawaii, teaching in the School of Business & Communication MBA Program and helping redesign it for entrepreneurship in local living economies. She is a member of the Evolutionary Leaders and a founding member of Rising Women; Rising World. She promotes a vision she believes will result in the sustainable health and well-being of humanity within the larger living systems of Earth and the cosmos.

She has appeared in films including Occupy Love, I Am, Femme, Love Thy Nature and Money & Life. Her books include EarthDance: Living Systems in Evolution, A Walk Through Time: from Stardust to Us,  Biology Revisioned (with Willis Harman). and new ebook Gaia’s Dance: The Story of Earth & Us.

Works
Papers
Ecosophy article at: http://www.kosmosjournal.org/article/ecosophy-natures-guide-to-a-better-world/ 
After Darwin 
Skills for the Age of Sustainability
Living Systems in Evolution

Books
Earthdance - Living Systems in Evolution
Biology Revisioned, with Willis Harman, North Atlantic Publishers 1998. 
A Walk Through Time: From Stardust to Us
Gaia's Dance: The Story of Earth & Us

References

External links
 
 Articles & interviews
 LifeWeb - articles and books
 Elisabet Sahtouris MP3 audio -  Nature's Secrets of Success from The Great Rethinking: Bath
 Video of Elisabet Sahtouris with the Dalai Lama during filming of the documentary "Dalai Lama Renaissance"
 Elisabet Sahtouris MP3 audio - from Shift in Action, sponsored by Institute of Noetic Sciences

Evolutionary biologists
University of Massachusetts Amherst faculty
Massachusetts Institute of Technology faculty
American people of Greek descent
Year of birth missing (living people)
Living people
21st-century American biologists